Irene Rutherford McLeod (21 August 1891 – 2 December 1968) was a British poet, writer and editor, published in the early twentieth century.

Life 
McLeod was born in Croydon, Surrey, on 21 August 1891. In 1919, she married the writer, classical scholar and translator Aubrey de Sélincourt. They had two daughters, Lesley (who married her first cousin, Christopher Robin Milne), and Anne.

She died on 2 December 1968 on the Isle of Wight.

Works 

When McLeod was in her late teens, she was involved with the women’s suffrage movement in London. Her play The Reforming of Augustus (1910) was written in support of the movement and performed at the Rehearsal Theatre, London. Following the success of The Reforming of Augustus, her plays The Boot and How Spring Came to Nutts Alley were performed in aid of the suffragist Young Purple, White, and Green Club (1912). Further work for the suffrage cause included acting in Evelyn Glover’s one-act play Which? to aid the Actresses' Franchise League and Break the Walls Down by Mrs Alexander Gross. She also acted in The Voysey Inheritance by Harley Granville-Barker and the premiere of The Eldest Son by John Galsworthy. 

Her works include volumes of poetry, drama, children's literature and novels. Her first book of poems, Songs to Save a Soul (1915), sold well and immediately went through six editions. 

McLeod published two novels. Graduation (1918) explored the adventures of Frieda, a free-thinking artist and Suffragette. Towards Love (1923) is a novel about the Great War, in which one of the protagonists is jailed as a conscientious objector.

Some of her poems, such as "Lone Dog" from Songs to Save a Soul, have been adapted to song.

Publications

Poetry 
 Songs to Save a Soul. (London: Chatto & Windus, 1915).
 Swords for Life. (London: Chatto & Windus, 1916).
 Before Dawn. (New York: B.W. Huebsch, 1918).
 The Darkest Hour. (London: Chatto & Windus, 1918).
 Six O'Clock and After: And Other Rhymes for Children. Irene McLeod and Aubrey de Sélincourt. (London: F. Muller, London, 1945).

Novels 
 Graduation. (London: Chatto & Windus, 1918).
 Towards Love. (London: W. Heinemann, London, 1923).

Drama 
 The Reforming of Augustus. (London: Woman's Press, 1910).

Works set to music 
 Heintzman, Cornelia Gerhard. Three Poems by Irene Rutherford McLeod. Arranged by Leo Smith. (USA: Cornelia Gerhard Heintzman, c1918).
 Head, Michael. Lone Dog. Words by Irene R. McLeod. (London: Boosey & Hawkes, 1960).
 Britten, Benjamin. Lone Dog: Unison Treble Voices & Piano. Words by Irene R. McLeod. (New York: Boosey & Hawkes, c1994).

References

External links 

 "Is Love, Then, So Simple." In Louis Untermeyer, ed. Modern British Poetry. New York, Harcourt, Brace and Howe, 1920. At Bartleby.com. 
 “Lone Dog.” In Louis Untermeyer, ed. Modern British Poetry. New York, Harcourt, Brace and Howe, 1920. At Bartleby.com.
 Songs to Save a Soul, full text at Google Books.
 Swords for Life, full text at Google Books. 
 The Darkest Hour, full text at Google Books.
 Before Dawn, full text at Google Books.
 
 

1891 births
1968 deaths
20th-century English poets
20th-century English dramatists and playwrights
20th-century English actresses
20th-century English novelists
Suffrage organisations in the United Kingdom
Suffragettes